Marcelo Augusto Mathias da Silva (26 August 1991 – 28 November 2016), simply known as Marcelo, was a Brazilian footballer who last played as a central defender for Chapecoense.

Marcelo was one of the victims when LaMia Airlines Flight 2933 crashed on 28 November 2016.

Club career

Volta Redonda
Marcelo was born in Juiz de Fora, Minas Gerais, but represented Macaé as a youth. After being released, he joined Volta Redonda in 2012.

Marcelo made his senior debut on 20 April 2012, starting in a 2–0 away win against Resende for the Campeonato Carioca championship. Regularly used during the club's run in Série D, he managed to appear in only one match during the following year's state championship, but returned to feature regularly in the following campaign.

Flamengo
On 23 April 2014, shortly after having his federative rights acquired by Cianorte, Marcelo was loaned to Série A club Flamengo until the end of 2015. He made his division debut on 27 July, starting in a 1–0 derby home win against Botafogo.

Marcelo scored his first goal in the main category of Brazilian football on 31 August 2014, netting the first in a 2–1 away win against Vitória. Ending the season as a starter, he fell down the pecking order in the following year, after the emergence of Samir and the arrival of César Martins.

Chapecoense
On 8 January 2016, Marcelo signed for fellow top tier club Chapecoense. He spent four months nursing an injury before returning to action on 27 November, in a 0–1 away loss against Palmeiras, which would be his last match.

Death
On 28 November 2016, whilst at the service of Chapecoense, Marcelo was among the fatalities of the LaMia Airlines Flight 2933 accident in the Colombian village of Cerro Gordo, La Unión, Antioquia.

Career statistics

Honours
Chapecoense
 Copa Sudamericana: 2016 (posthumously)

References

External links

1991 births
2016 deaths
People from Juiz de Fora
Brazilian footballers
Association football defenders
Campeonato Brasileiro Série A players
Campeonato Brasileiro Série D players
Volta Redonda FC players
CR Flamengo footballers
Associação Chapecoense de Futebol players
Footballers killed in the LaMia Flight 2933 crash
Sportspeople from Minas Gerais